is a Japanese film based on the manga series of the same name written and illustrated by Ritz Kobayashi.

Cast

Minami Hamabe as Saki Miyanaga
Nana Asakawa as Nodoka Haramura
Aika Hirota as Yūki Kataoka
Mai Kikuchi as Koromo Amae
Rena Takeda as Kana Ikeda
Seika Furuhata as Hisa Takei
Anna Yamada as Mako Someya
Mariya Nagao as Tōka Ryūmonbuchi
Kyōka Shibata as Hajime Kunihiro
 as Jun Inoue
Rie Kaneko as Tomoki Sawamura
 as Mihoko Fukuji
 as Miharu Yoshitome
 as Sumiyo Fukabori
Yuzu Higuchi as Seika Bundō
Natsumi Okamoto as Yumi Kajiki
Ano as Momoko Tōyoko
Aguri Ōnishi as Satomi Kanbara
 as Kaori Senō
 as Mutsuki Tsuyama
Natsuna Watanabe as Yasuko Fujita
Hinako Sano as Takako Kubo
 as Hagiyoshi

References

External links
  
 

2017 films
Works about mahjong
Films directed by Yūichi Onuma
Live-action films based on manga
Films about board games
2010s Japanese films
2010s Japanese-language films